Stephen James Vickers (born 21 April 1951) is a Canadian former professional ice hockey player. He played ten seasons in the National Hockey League (NHL) with the New York Rangers from 1972 to 1982. He won the Calder Memorial Trophy in 1973.

Playing career
Steve "The Sarge" Vickers played junior hockey with the Toronto Marlboros of the Ontario Hockey Association (OHA) and was named a First Team league All-Star.  He was drafted 10th overall by the New York Rangers in the 1971 NHL Amateur Draft. He spent a season in the minor leagues with the Omaha Knights of the Central Hockey League before the Rangers called him up in 1972.

Vickers, centre Walt Tkaczuk and winger Bill Fairbairn formed a line that proved to be one of the 1970s' best two-way forward trios.  Vickers scored 30 goals and 23 assists for a total of 53 points and was awarded the Calder Memorial Trophy as rookie of the year.  He played all of his NHL career with the Rangers, scoring thirty or more goals in each of four seasons.  He was later moved to the Rangers' first line with Rod Gilbert and Jean Ratelle.  Vickers' best season was 1974-75, when he scored 41 goals and was named to the NHL's Second All-Star team. He remained effective until his final season, in which his production dropped sharply; he finished the year in the minor leagues with the Springfield Indians, after which he retired.

Vickers played in the NHL All-Star Game in 1975 and 1976. He made NHL history in 1972 when he became the first rookie, as well as the first New York Ranger, to score hat tricks in two consecutive games (12 November versus the Los Angeles Kings and 15 November versus the Philadelphia Flyers). In February 1976, Vickers set the Rangers team record for most points in a game, with seven, against the Washington Capitals.

Legacy 
In the 2009 book 100 Ranger Greats, the authors ranked Vickers at No. 18 all-time of the 901 New York Rangers who had played during the team's first 82 seasons.

In 2021, Steve Vickers was inducted into the Aurora Sports Hall of Fame (aurorashof.ca).

Click on the link and watch Vicker’s induction ceremony and video documentary.
https://aurorashof.ca/inductee/steve-vickers/

Career statistics

Regular season and playoffs

References

External links

1951 births
Living people
Calder Trophy winners
Canadian ice hockey left wingers
National Hockey League first-round draft picks
New York Rangers draft picks
New York Rangers players
Omaha Knights (CHL) players
Springfield Indians players
Ice hockey people from Toronto
Toronto Marlboros players